Stade Olympique Chambérien Rugby is a French rugby union club from Chambéry, Savoie that play in the Nationale, third tier of the French league system.

Current standings

Notable former players
 Gia Labadze
 Ilia Zedginidze
 Beka Bitsadze
 Ben Venter
 Dean Grant
 Felipe Berchesi

External links
Official website

Rugby clubs established in 1898
SO Chambery
Sport in Chambéry
Sport in Savoie